Lost Creek Township is an inactive township in Wayne County, in the U.S. state of Missouri.

Lost Creek Township was erected in 1872, taking its name from Lost Creek.

References

Townships in Missouri
Townships in Wayne County, Missouri